Fidget may refer to:

 ST Fidget, a British Admiralty tugboat
 Fidgeting, the inability to sit still for a period of time
 A fidget toy,  a type of stress-relieving toy such as a fidget spinner
 Fidget house, a genre of Electro house
 Fidget, a secondary villain in the 1986 animated children's film The Great Mouse Detective.
Fidget, a secondary protagonist in the 2012 video game Dust: An Elysian Tail
 Fidgets, a term used for thieving midgets disguised as babies, in the Our Gang film Free Eats

See also
 
 
 Phidget, a type of electronics component